The following highways are numbered 410:

Canada
Manitoba Provincial Road 410
 Newfoundland and Labrador Route 410
 Ontario Highway 410
 Quebec Autoroute 410

Japan
 Japan National Route 410

United States
  Interstate 410
  U.S. Route 410 (former)
  Georgia State Route 410 (unsigned designation for the western half of the Stone Mountain Freeway)
  Louisiana Highway 410
  Maryland Route 410
 New York:
  New York State Route 410
  County Route 410 (Erie County, New York)
  North Carolina Highway 410
  Oregon Route 410
  Pennsylvania Route 410
  Puerto Rico Highway 410
  South Carolina Highway 410
  Texas State Highway Loop 410, two former roads
  Virginia State Route 410 (former)
  Washington State Route 410
  Wyoming Highway 410